Cryptoblepharus ustulatus, also known commonly, as the russet snake-eyed skink, is a species of lizard in the family Scincidae. The species is endemic to the Australian state of Western Australia.

References

Further reading
Cogger HG (2014). Reptiles and Amphibians of Australia, Seventh Edition. Clayton, Victoria, Australia: CSIRO Publishing. xxx + 1,033 pp. .
Horner P (2007). "Systematics of the snake-eyed skinks, Cryptoblepharus Wiegmann (Reptilia: Squamata: Scincidae) – an Australian-based review". The Beagle Supplement 3: 21–198. (Cryptoblepharus ustulatus, new species).
Wilson, Steve; Swan, Gerry (2013). A Complete Guide to Reptiles of Australia, Fourth Edition. Sydney: New Holland Publishers. 522 pp. .

Cryptoblepharus
Skinks of Australia
Endemic fauna of Australia
Reptiles described in 2007
Taxa named by Paul Horner (herpetologist)